Ursula Mariana Șchiopu (July 30, 1918 - March 4, 2015) was a Romanian psychologist, academic, and poet. She contributed to the development of the psychology of peace, war, and terrorism.

Selected works
Psychological
 Psihologia copilului, vol. I și II, Editura Didactică și Pedagogică;
 Psihologia copilului, E.D.P., 1963;
 Psihologia copilului, E.D.P., 1976, ediția a II-a;
 Introducere în psihodiagnostic, T.U.B.;
 Orientare școlară și profesională, T.U.B., 1971;
 Psihologia vârstelor, E.D.P., (with Emil Verza);
 Dezvoltarea operativității gândirii, Editura Științifică, 1966, preface by acad. Gh. Mihoc; 
 Criza de originalitate la adolescenți, E.D.P., 1970;
 Probleme psihologice ale jocului și distracțiilor, E.D.P., 1970;
 Dicționar enciclopedic de psihologie, T.U.B., 1969; 
 Adolescență, personalitate, limbaj, Ed. Albatros, 1989, with Emil Verza;
 Psihologia vârstelor, E.D.P., 1997, with Emil Verza;
 Psihologia generală a copilului, E.D.P., 1982 ediția I și 1985 – ediția a II-a, with V. Pisloi;
 Dicționar enciclopedic de psihologie, editor, București, Ed. Babel, 1997;
 Psihologia artelor, E.D.P., 1999;
 Psihologia diferențială (2 vol.), România Press, 2006;
 Istoria psihologiei, Ed Academiei Române, 2007;
 Psihologia moderna, Ed. Diana Press SRL, 2008.

Poetry
 Drum prin zodii, 1939; 
 Cer troglodit,1943; 
 Poeme, 1967; 
 Reîntoarcerile, 1973;
 Peisaj interior, 1970;
 Pendul cosmic,1984;
 Mărturisiri de noapte,1980;
 La marginea timpului care își caută umbra,2004;
 Antologia poeziei canadiene franceze,1976, com Al. Andrițoiu.

Notes

2015 deaths
University of Bucharest alumni
1918 births